Chaudhary Zakir Hussain is an Indian politician. He serves as administrator of Haryana Waqf Board Government. He is a three term former member of the Haryana Legislative Assembly from the Indian National Lokdal party. He represented the Nuh (city) and Taoru Vidhan sabha Constituency. He is National Vice President of Bharatiya Janata Party Minority Morcha.

Ancestors
Hussain's grandfather Ch. Mohd. Yasin Khan served as Member of Punjab Legislative Council and Assembly from 1926 to 1946 and 1952 to 1962. He was elected unopposed to Punjab Legislative Assembly in 1952. He was the first college graduate in the Meo (Muslim) Community. He was responsible for the Meo Community's decision to stay in India at the behest of Mahatma Gandhi, Maulana Abdul Kalam Azad and other leaders, instead of going to Pakistan. He founded many educational Institutions and was the leader of the Mewat area as a whole and Meo Community.

His father Choudhary Tayyab Husain was a Member of Parliament (Lok Sabha) in 1971 and 1980 from Gurgaon and Faridabad respectively. He served as an MLA in Punjab 1962, 1966; MLA in Haryana 1966–67, 1984–87, 1987–91; and MLA in Rajasthan in 1993-98, 1998-2003. He served as MLA from 59 Tauru Assembly Constituency in Haryana. He served as Minister in Punjab, Haryana and Rajasthan several times. He is the only person in the country who served as Minister in three states. He was the Chaudhary (Social Head) of Meo (Muslim) Community which is about five crore in population mainly in Haryana, UP, Rajasthan, Madhya Pradesh, Delhi etc. He was associated with several educational institutions. 

He was (i) General Secretary, Old Boys Associations, Aligarh Muslim University, (ii) Member, Court of AMU, (iii) Member, Executive Council of AMU and (iv) Vice President of the India Islamic Cultural Centre, New Delhi. On 7 October, 2008 Late Ch. Tayyab Hussain died of a heart attack.

On the eve of Fatiha, his eldest son Ch. Zakir Hussain was designated as the Chaudhary (Social Head) of Meo (Muslim) Community and Mewat by the representatives assembled at Nuh from all Over the country.

References 

Living people
Members of the Haryana Legislative Assembly
Indian National Lok Dal politicians
Bharatiya Janata Party politicians from Haryana
People from Gurgaon
Year of birth missing (living people)